Don't Cry Frenchy, Don't Cry is a 1919 song written during World War I. The lyrics were written by Sam M. Lewis and Joe Young, and the music was written by Walter Donaldson.The song was published by Waterson, Berlin & Snyder Company in New York City.

"Don't Cry Frenchy, Don't Cry" depicts a soldier returning home from France, but sadly leaving his war romance behind. He assures her in the chorus, "We'll hear wedding bells chime. Oh! please don't cry, Frenchy, don't cry." The original sheet music cover depicts a woman crying. In another edition of sheet music the title was changed to "Don't Cry Frenchy," and the sheet music cover shows a woman waving at a ship. The song attracted the international public, who wanted to believe in its hopeful message that "peaceful stars" will soon begin to "heal the scars of Flanders."

Don't Cry, Frenchy was 19th in the top 20 charts in May and June 1919 and was recorded by both Lewis James and Charles Hart & Elliot Shaw.

The sheet music can be found at the Pritzker Military Museum & Library.

References

External links
Don't Cry Frenchy, Don't Cry Sheet Music at University of Illinois at Urbana-Champaign University Library
Don't Cry Frenchy, Don't Cry at Library of Congress
Don't Cry Frenchy, Don't Cry wax cylinder recording at University of California, Santa Barbara Library

Bibliography
Parker, Bernard S. World War I Sheet Music 1. Jefferson: McFarland & Company, Inc., 2007. . 
Paas, John Roger. 2014. America sings of war: American sheet music from World War I. . 
Vogel, Frederick G. World War I Songs: A History and Dictionary of Popular American Patriotic Tunes, with Over 300 Complete Lyrics. Jefferson: McFarland & Company, Inc., 1995. . 

Songs about parting
Songs about soldiers
Songs about France
1919 songs
Songs of World War I
Songs with lyrics by Sam M. Lewis
Songs with lyrics by Joe Young (lyricist)
Songs with music by Walter Donaldson